The Scarifyers is an audio adventure and comic book series produced by Bafflegab Productions (formerly Cosmic Hobo Productions) and based on stories written by Simon Barnard and Paul Morris. Set in 1936 and 1937, it originally followed the exploits of DI Lionheart and ghost-story writer Professor Edward Dunning, as played by Nicholas Courtney and Terry Molloy. (It may be no coincidence that 'Edward Dunning' is the name of the protagonist of M R James' ghost story, "Casting the Runes", a man knowledgeable about the occult.)

Each adventure is a self-contained story and is released on CD and direct download. The first two stories, The Nazad Conspiracy and The Devil of Denge Marsh, were broadcast on BBC7 in 2007. A third story, For King and Country, guest-starring Gabriel Woolf, was released in early 2008 and broadcast in 2009. The fourth story The Curse of the Black Comet, guest-starring Brian Blessed, was released in 2009 and broadcast in 2010. The fifth story, The Secret Weapon of Doom, guest-starring Leslie Phillips and Nigel Havers, was released in 2010 and broadcast on BBC Radio 4 Extra in early 2012.

In 2011, after the death of actor Nicholas Courtney, it was announced that David Warner would be joining the series. His first Scarifyers story, The Magic Circle, centred on the disappearance of Lionheart, and introduced new lead character Harry Crow, Lionheart's former police colleague. It was released in November 2011 and broadcast on BBC Radio 4 Extra in 2012. The seventh Scarifyers story, The Horror of Loch Ness, was released in June 2012 and features the final performance of Philip Madoc. An eighth adventure, The Thirteen Hallows featuring Torchwoods Gareth David-Lloyd was released in December 2012. A ninth adventure, The King of Winter, was released in October 2014, and guest-starred Guy Henry. The tenth story, 'The Gnomes of Death' was released on 30 June 2017.

There is also a series of three short comic 'Scarifyers for Christmas' stories: 'Mr Crowley's Christmas', 'The Yule Lads' and 'The Curse of the Cult of Thoth', broadcast on Radio 4 Extra in 2010. During the Covid 19 lockdown they released a free story on 19 April 2020 - The Scarifyers: Cold Call.

Each play has featured cover artwork by Garen Ewing. The comic was written by Simon Barnard, and illustrated by 2000AD artist Simon Gurr.

Audio plays

References

External links
 
Bafflegab - Production Company Behind The Scarifyers

BBC Radio 4 Extra programmes
2007 radio programme debuts
BBC Radio 7 (rebranded) programmes